The LuxX Price is the main stock market index of the Luxembourg Stock Exchange, the stock exchange based in Luxembourg City, in southern Luxembourg.  The LuxX is a weighted index of the nine most valuable listed stocks by free floated market capitalisation (ten until the collapse of Fortis in 2008).  The index was fixed at 1,000 on 4 January 1999: the first day of trading after Luxembourg adopted the euro.  The nine companies currently included in the index are:

Historical quotes

Footnotes

External links
 Luxembourg Stock Exchange official website
Bloomberg page for LUXXX:IND

European stock market indices
Economy of Luxembourg